The 2022 Welsh local elections took place on 5 May 2022 to elect members of all twenty-two local authorities in Wales. They were held alongside other local elections in the United Kingdom. The previous elections were held in 2017.

The Welsh Conservatives lost over a third of their seats and their majority in the Monmouthshire County Council. Plaid Cymru won outright control of four councils, which was the highest number in the party's history, however their overall number of councillors had decreased.

Background
In the local elections in 2017, 1,271 seats were elected. Welsh Labour won 468 seats, independent candidates won 309 seats, Plaid Cymru won 208 seats, the Welsh Conservatives won 184 seats, and the Welsh Liberal Democrats won 63 seats. Other parties including the Wales Green Party won 22 seats. The 2022 Welsh local elections were initially scheduled for 2021, to give councillors a four-year term, but they were delayed to 2022 to avoid clashing with the 2021 Senedd election. The 2021 Local Government and Elections (Wales) Act permanently changed the term length for councillors from four years to five years.

Ahead of the 2022 elections, eleven of the twenty-two councils in Wales were under no overall control with no single party holding more than half of the seats. Labour controlled seven councils, Independents controlled two councils, and the Conservatives and Plaid Cymru each controlled one council.

Process
To have been able to vote in the 2022 local elections in Wales a person must be aged 16 or over on the day of the election (also called "polling day"), have been registered to vote by the morning of the 14 April 2022, registered at an address in Wales, and not be legally excluded from voting. The deadline for applications to vote by post was 19 April 2022, of which a request must have been put in writing. Persons wishing to vote must also be one of the following:
    
 a British citizen
 an Irish or EU citizen
 a qualifying Commonwealth citizen
 a citizen of another country living in Scotland or Wales who has permission to enter or stay in the UK, or who does not need permission

For this election, councils in Wales use first-past-the-post voting (FPTP) in single-member wards and block voting in multi-member wards. For the next election in 2027, councils will choose whether to conduct elections under FPTP or the single transferable vote, due to changes in legislation in Wales.

Principal councils

Elections were held for all councillors in all 22 local authorities, all of which were conducted under new boundaries. These boundary changes mean a number of seats have been redrawn and the total number of councillors in Wales will fall from 1,254 to 1,233, a decrease of 21.

Candidates
2,436 candidates sought election to 1,231 seats.

 1.Plaid Cymru figures include Plaid Cymru and Green Party Common Ground Alliance candidates in Cardiff.

Councils

Results 

The Conservatives lost 86 councillors and lost control of the one council which they administered, Monmouthshire. Though Plaid Cymru lost a small amount of councillors, they consolidated and gained three councils. The Liberal Democrats became the largest party in Powys council. The Welsh Green Party gained 8 councillors across 7 councils. Propel gained one councillor in Cardiff.

Whilst Labour gained two councils and lost one, they gained 66 councillors across the country.

Analysis

Ward result maps

By council

See also
 List of political parties in Wales
 Politics of Wales

References

Council elections in Wales
 
May 2022 events in the United Kingdom
2022 United Kingdom local elections